Southlake Regional Health Centre (formerly known as York County Hospital) is a hospital located in Newmarket, Ontario, Canada. Through various expansions during its history, it has grown into a university-affiliated teaching and research facility, specifically offering advanced cardiac, cancer and thoracic care.

Overview
Southlake Regional Health Centre is a full-service hospital with a regional, clinically advanced focus.

Southlake offers over 400 patient beds and accommodates more than 90,000 visits to the Emergency Department, 22,000 in-patient admissions, and 600,000 out-patient visits each year. As a regionally designated site, Southlake is responsible for developing and providing advanced levels of care to the more than one million people.

Advanced, specialty services include:

 Arthritis care  
 Cancer care 
 Cardiac care
 Cataract surgery 
 Child and adolescent eating disorders 
 Mental health services for children 
 Paediatrics and perinatal care 
 Thoracic surgery

Southlake employs a team of more than 3000, including over 540 physicians.  In addition, there are 900 volunteers.
Registered Nurses and Respiratory Therapists are represented by the Ontario Nurses Association Local 124.

History
A private hospital was founded on August 22, 1922, the province granted a Charter of Incorporation for the York County Hospital Corporation.  York County Hospital became a public hospital in 1924. In 1927 the new hospital building was completed by architects Craig and Madill. In 1946, the Margaret Johnson Davis Wing opened with 55 beds. In 1956, the South Wing opened and a six-storey tower opened in 1964.  Capacity was increased to 420 beds with the opening of the East Wing in 1976.  On September 12, 1998, the name of the hospital was changed from York County Hospital to the present name. In 1999, a project to further expand the hospital was begun

In October 2015, Southlake Regional Health Centre was once again named one of Greater Toronto's Top 100 Employers by a company named Mediacorp Canada Inc., and published by the Toronto Star.

The hospital is connected to the Southlake Regional Cancer Centre to its west, and to a Medical Arts building by an arch bridge to its north occupied principally by University of Toronto's Family Medicine Teaching Unit and other health services. The Stronach Regional Cancer Centre is partnered with Princess Margaret Hospital.

Teaching and Research
Through its relationships with the University of Toronto, York University, McMaster University, as well as Princess Margaret Hospital, Southlake Regional Health Centre has become a research and teaching facility.  Currently, the hospital is averaging more than 6,000 medical training days per year, which is approximately triple its numbers in 2008.

Through the Health Centre's Research Institute, Southlake is focusing its energy on a growing number of clinical drug and device trials, and on key research activities in biomedical and population health research. Many staff members and physicians contribute their clinical expertise in a number of regional, provincial, national, and international research studies.

References

Hospitals in the Regional Municipality of York
Hospital buildings completed in 1964
Hospital buildings completed in 1976
Hospitals established in 1922
Buildings and structures in Newmarket, Ontario